The 2018–19 season was Sport Lisboa e Benfica's 115th season in existence and the club's 85th consecutive season in the top flight of Portuguese football. It started with the UEFA Champions League third qualifying round on 7 August 2018 and concluded on 18 May 2019 with Benfica becoming Primeira Liga champions for a record 37th time.

Internationally, Benfica played in the Champions League group stage for the ninth successive time, a Portuguese record ranking fourth all-time. However, with two losses at Estádio da Luz, they set a domestic record of five consecutive home matches without a win in the competition. After finishing third in their group, they moved to the UEFA Europa League knockout phase, where they reached the quarter-finals.

Players

Squad information

Transfers

In

Out

Appearances and goals

|-
! colspan=16 style=background:#dcdcdc; text-align:center|Goalkeepers

|-
! colspan=16 style=background:#dcdcdc; text-align:center|Defenders

|-
! colspan=16 style=background:#dcdcdc; text-align:center|Midfielders

|-
! colspan=16 style=background:#dcdcdc; text-align:center|Forwards

|-
! colspan=16 style=background:#dcdcdc; text-align:center|Players who made an appearance and/or had a squad number but left the team
|-

|}

Technical staff

{| class="wikitable"
|-
! Position
! Name
|-
| Head coach
| Bruno Lage
|-
| Assistant coaches
| Nélson VeríssimoMinervino PietraMarco Pedroso
|-
| Video analyst
| Jhony Conceição
|-
| Fitness coach
| Alexandre Silva
|-
| Goalkeeping coach
| Fernando Ferreira

Pre-season friendlies
On 15 May 2018, Benfica announced their pre-season schedule (updated on 28 June), which included the following matches:

Competitions

Overall record

Primeira Liga

League table

Results by round

Matches

Taça de Portugal

Benfica were eliminated on away goals.

Taça da Liga

Third round

Semi-finals

UEFA Champions League

Third qualifying round

Benfica won 2–1 on aggregate.

Play-off round

Benfica won 5–2 on aggregate.

Group stage

UEFA Europa League

Knockout phase

Round of 32

Benfica won 2–1 on aggregate.

Round of 16

Benfica won 3–1 on aggregate.

Quarter-finals

Benfica were eliminated on away goals.

References
Notes

Citations

S.L. Benfica seasons
Benfica
Portuguese football championship-winning seasons
Benfica
Benfica